Cayla Alexis McFarlane (born 10 June 2002) is an American-raised Trinidad and Tobago footballer who plays as a forward for the Harvard Crimson and the Trinidad and Tobago women's national team.

International career
McFarlane played for Trinidad and Tobago at senior level in the 2020 CONCACAF Women's Olympic Qualifying Championship qualification.

References

https://gocrimson.com/sports/womens-soccer/roster/cayla-mcfarlane/24113

External links

2002 births
Living people
Women's association football forwards
Women's association football midfielders
Trinidad and Tobago women's footballers
Trinidad and Tobago women's international footballers
American women's soccer players
Soccer players from California
Sportspeople from Pasadena, California
African-American women's soccer players
American sportspeople of Trinidad and Tobago descent
Harvard Crimson women's soccer players
21st-century African-American sportspeople
21st-century African-American women